Baroot is a town and union council of Hub Tehsil, Lasbela District, Balochistan, Pakistan.

References

Union councils of Lasbela District
Populated places in Lasbela District